Lézarde may refer to the following rivers in France:

Lézarde (Guadeloupe), a river in Guadeloupe
Lézarde (Martinique), a river in Martinique
Lézarde (Seine), a tributary of the Seine in the Seine-Maritime department